Dr. Mircea Neșu (29 September 1940 – 20 October 2014) was a Romanian footballer who played as a midfielder.

Career
Mircea Neșu played for Crișana Oradea, Viitorul București, Universitatea Cluj and Crișul Oradea, having earned 145 matches and 5 goals in the Romanian top-league Divizia A. He played 99 Divizia A matches, scoring five goals for Universitatea Cluj, a team with which he also won the only trophy in his career, the 1964–65 Cupa României. After he ended his playing career he became a referee who arbitrated Divizia A and Divizia B matches during 1978–1986. He also arbitrated at international and European club level. In 1992 Mircea Neșu was Romanian Democratic Convention's candidate for mayor of Oradea, but he lost the elections to Petru Filip. He also worked as a doctor. His son, Mihai Neșu and grandson Nikos Barboudis were also footballers.

Honours
Crișana Oradea
Divizia B: 1961–62
Universitatea Cluj
Cupa României: 1964–65
Crișul Oradea
Divizia B: 1970–71

References

External links
Labtof player profile
Labtof referee profile

Romanian footballers
Association football midfielders
1940 births
2014 deaths
Liga I players
Liga II players
CA Oradea players
FC Universitatea Cluj players
FC Bihor Oradea players
Romanian football referees
UEFA Champions League referees